Daaliya Pookkal is a 1980 Indian Malayalam film,  directed by Prathap Singh. The film stars Pappan, Roopesh, Shobha and Jameela Malik in the lead roles. The film has musical score by Kanjangad Ramachandran.

Cast
Pappan
Roopesh
Shobha
Jameela Malik
M. G. Soman
Mala Aravindan
Mallika Sukumaran
P. K. Venukkuttan Nair

Soundtrack
The music was composed by Kanjangad Ramachandran and the lyrics were written by K. K. Venugopal.

References

External links
 

1980 films
1980s Malayalam-language films
Films scored by Kanhangad Ramachandran